Jason Cosmo is a fictional character who is the hero of a series of novels by author Dan McGirt. The books consist of Jason Cosmo  (Signet 1989), Royal Chaos (Roc 1990), and Dirty Work (Roc 1993). The non-trilogy is a comedy, parodying the pulp fantasy genre with a style similar to Douglas Adams or Terry Pratchett.

As of January 2006, McGirt has announced work on "digitally remastered" revisions of his series, with the first book retitled Jason Cosmo: Hero Wanted. He also has announced work on Boltblaster (described as "Volume One of the Boltblaster Chronicles").

External links
Jason Cosmo Update

Cosmo, Jason